The men's 800 metres event at the 2007 Asian Athletics Championships was held in Amman, Jordan on July 27–28.

Medalists

Results

Heats

Final

References
Heats results
Final results

2007 Asian Athletics Championships
800 metres at the Asian Athletics Championships